Sivi is a 2007 Indian Tamil-language horror film directed by K. R. Senthil Nathan and starring Yogi, Jayashri Rao and Anuja Iyer. A remake of the 2004 Thai film Shutter, Sivi was released on 21 September 2007 across theatres in Tamil Nadu.

Plot
The movie begins with Krishna (Yogi) a young photographer, and his girlfriend Sona (Jayashri Rao) accidentally running down a young woman on their drive home after a night's party on a deserted stretch of East Coast Road near Chennai. They decide to leave the dead body and drive away. Later, Krishna discovers something strange when he finds a mysterious shadow that appears on the pictures he takes with his camera. Ever since the accident, Krishna has been experiencing shoulder and neck pains.

He thinks that it is just a bad picture, but then he realizes that there is something more sinister behind the shadow on the picture frame and the extremely unsettling dreams. Unable to cope, they start investigating the phenomenon of the ghost appearing on the photographs, which leads to a discovery about Krishna's past, and a possible clue to the identity of their ghostly nemesis. As Sona goes to college and starts taking pictures of the college and the library, Sona had found the girl that was hit on the road and was in the pictures, a young shy girl named Nandhini (Anuja Iyer). Krishna's friends have also committed suicide by jumping off buildings.

A flashback reveals that Krishna had once dated Nandhini, as the relationship ended with Krishna dumping her and Nandhini cutting herself. As she continues to haunt Krishna and Sona, they go and visit her mother, where it is revealed that there is a coffin near the shed with Nandhini's body inside in her mother's house and revealed that she committed suicide and her mother could not bear to cremate the body. Krishna is haunted by the girl and ends up been thrown off a fire escape. Sona realizes that Krishna's friends had raped Nandhini and revealed that Krishna had taken photos of the rape, so Sona leaves him. Still haunted by Nandhini, Krishna begins to take pictures around the apartment to find Nandhini, as he throws the camera, the Polaroid takes by itself, as it is revealed that the mysterious neck pains were from Nandhini sitting on his shoulders, as Krishna is thrown off the apartment. Sona visits Krishna; as the door swings, the reflection shows Nandhini still sitting on his shoulders.

Cast

Production
In February 2007, Senthilnathan, who had apprenticed under S. J. Surya, announced that he would make a horror film titled Sivi and would be in charge of the screenplay and dialogues, apart from direction. The film's story was taken from the 2004 Thai-thriller, Shutter, with Indian elements infused into the script. Yogi, the grandson of actor Thengai Srinivasan, was selected to play his second lead role after Azhagiya Asura (2006), while newcomers Jayashree Rao and Anuja Iyer were also selected to play lead roles. Dharan, who had earlier worked on Parijatham (2006), was announced as the music director for the film. Vignesh Shivan worked on the film as an assistant director, and also appeared in a supporting role as the lead actor's friend.

Soundtrack

The soundtrack of the film was composed by Dharan. Union Minister G. K. Vasan released the audio cassette of Sivi at a function held in Chennai on 29 July 2007 with attendees including directors Ameer, Subramaniam Siva and Tamil Film Producers Council president Rama Narayanan. The soundtrack became critically acclaimed with a reviewer noting that Dharan "has oodles of talent, and he definitely knows the pulse of today's generation". La. Rajkumar wrote lyrics for two of the film's songs, while Dr Burn wrote his own lyrics for his rap portions.

Release
The film received generally positive reviews, with The Hindu stating that the "film scares in parts" and that "Yogi has performed his role convincingly, while Jayasri Rao needs to improve" and that "Anuja Iyer as the ghost has done a good job". A critic from Indiaglitz.com labelled the film as a "welcome relief", noting that "the movie is technically rich and the star cast give their best on screen makes it work. But giving the movie its true color is Dharan's top-class background score. His good re-recording helps sustain the momentum of the movie and wraps audience to their seats."

The reviewer from Behindwoods.com stated "the film has a bright chance of becoming a commercial success", mentioning that "debutant director Senthil Nathan has diligently worked hard and the film stands a testimony to his efforts. A bright future is in store for this talented director. Seamless and taut editing by Sasikumar spices up the terror quotient of the film." Reviewers from Sify.com cited that "Yogi as Krishna is one of the most impressive actors, one has seen in recent times. The director has been able to give an eerie look and feel to the film", while Rediff.com said "it is the climax though, that packs a punch, and worth all the minutes of waiting, watching and wondering. An end that fits perfectly with the tone of the story, incidentally tying up with the title of the movie as well. A pat on the back to the editor for some slick work."

Legacy
In late 2007, Senthilnathan and Yogi planned to collaborate again for a film titled Naan, but the project did not develop into production.

Production on a prequel for the film, titled Sivi 2 (2022), began in early 2021, with the film eventually released in July 2022. The sequel of the film took forward the story from the original version.

References

2007 films
Indian remakes of Thai films
Indian horror films
2000s Tamil-language films
Fiction about photography
Indian horror film remakes
Films scored by Dharan Kumar
2007 horror films